The red-tailed hawk kemsiesi (Buteo jamaicensis kemsiesi) is a dark subspecies of red-tailed hawk resident from Chiapas, Mexico, to Nicaragua. This race is similar to the southwestern red-tailed hawk (B. j. fuertesi) but markedly smaller, with its thighs barred with rufous. The dark wing marking may not be distinct in paler birds. A dark morph, similar to the western red-tailed hawk (B. j. calurus), is known to occur in this race.

References 

Red-tailed hawk (kemsiesi)